Quetta is a district in the north-west of the Balochistan province of Pakistan, on the border with Kandahar province, Afghanistan. It is part of Quetta Division. The district is famous for its agriculture produce, most notably fruit orchards but also including apples and grapes. The Hanna Valley is an area where almonds are grown.

History
The ancient name of Quetta was Shalkot, a term by which it is still known among the people of the country. The district was held in turns by the Ghaznavids, Ghurids, and Mongols, and towards the end of the fifteenth century was conferred by the ruler of Herat on Shah Beg Arghun, who, however, had shortly to give way before the rising power of the Mughals. The Ain-i-Akbari mentions both Shal and Pishin as supplying military service and revenue to Akbar, however these areas passed with Kandahar to the Safavids. On the rise of the Khilji power in Kandahar at the beginning of the eighteenth century, simultaneously with that of the Baloch in Kalat, Quetta and Pishin became the battle-ground between Afghan and Baloch, Ahmad Shah Durrani finally handed Quetta over to the Khan of Kalat Nasir I for helping him against Persians in 1751, against the Marathas in Third Battle of Panipat (1761) and against the Sikhs in 1765.

British Era
During the 19th century Quetta (Shalkot) was captured by the British troops during the Second Anglo-Afghan War of 1879.

On the advance of the British Army of the Indus in 1839, Captain Bean was appointed the first Political Agent in Shalkot, and the country was managed by him on behalf of Shah Shuja-ul-mulk. After Sir Robert Sandeman's mission to Kalat in 1876, the Quetta Fort was occupied by his escort and the country was managed on behalf of the Khan of Kalat up to 1883, when it was leased to the British Government for an annual rent of Rs. 25,000 through a treaty between Khan and the British Empire. It was formed, with Pishin and Shorarud, into a single administrative charge in 1883. Up to 1888 Old Chaman was the most advanced post on the frontier; but, on the extension of the railroad across the Khwaja Amran, the terminus was fixed at its present site,  from that place. The boundary with Afghanistan was finally demarcated in 1895–6.

The city area of Shalkot was inhabited by the Kasi tribe and the surroundings were occupied by Bazai Tribe with few other nomads including the tribes of Sulaimankhail, Kharoti, Nasar, and Baitanai. Being on the outskirts of Kandahar, it was not much developed. With the arrival of British troops, doors of development were opened. Very soon people saw roads, trains and schools in the area.

Administrative divisions

Subdivisions
In 1975, Quetta and Pishin were made separate districts. Quetta District today consists of two towns, and one sub-tehsil. District Quetta was declared as City District in 2001 having two tehsils and one sub-tehsil with total 67 Union councils.
 Tehsil Quetta City
 Tehsil Quetta Saddar 
 Sub-Tehsil Panjpai
Also categorized as the following:
 Zarghoon
 Chiltan
 Panjpai Sub-Tehsil

Provincial assembly
The district is represented in the provincial assembly by six constituencies.

Demographics
In 2017, the population of the district was 2,269,473, of which 1,190,476 were male and 1,078,718 female. Rural population was 1,270,088 (55.96%) while the urban population was 999,385 (44.04%). The literacy rate was 58.76% - the male literacy rate was 69.56% while the female literacy rate was 46.74%. Islam was the predominant religion with 98.54% while Christians are 1.09% of the population.

At the time of the 2017 census, 55.90% of the population spoke Pashto, 15.69% Brahui, 7.29% Balochi, 4.60% Punjabi, 2.34% Urdu, 1.61% Sindhi, 1.46% Saraiki and 1.15% Hindko as their first language. Around 200,000 speakers of 'Other' languages were recorded in the census, mainly Hazaragi. Hazaras, who speak Dari, are one of the other main ethnic groups in Quetta, having fled there as refugees since the 1990s.

In 1998, % of the population resided in urban areas. The major religion is Islam (%), but there are also Christian (%) and Hindu (0.5%) communities. The most common first languages according to the 1998 census are Pashto (%), Balochi (%) and Punjabi (%). The number for Balochi speakers also includes speakers of Brahui, who are normally bilingual with Balochi. Languages in the 1981 census were counted at the level of the household: Pashto was the language of % of households, Punjabi of %, Brahui of %, Urdu of % and Balochi of %. There is also a population of Hazaras.

Notable people

References

Bibliography

External links

 Quetta District at 
 Quetta District at 

 
Districts of Balochistan, Pakistan